Dezekan (also Romanized as Dezekān; also known as Dezak, Dezeh Kān, Zākā, and Z̄erreh Kā) is a village in Jahangiri Rural District, in the Central District of Masjed Soleyman County, Khuzestan Province, Iran. At the 2006 census, its population was 42, in 8 families.

References 

Populated places in Masjed Soleyman County